Allerastria albiciliatus is a moth species in the family Erebidae. It is found in North America.

The MONA or Hodges number for Allerastria albiciliatus is 9020.

References

Further reading

 
 
 

Boletobiinae
Articles created by Qbugbot
Moths described in 1903